2010 in professional wrestling describes the year's events in the world of professional wrestling.

List of notable promotions 
These promotions held notable shows in 2010.

Calendar of notable shows

January

February

March

April

May

June

July

August

September

October

November

December

Accomplishments and tournaments

AAA

Ring of Honor

TNA

WWE

WWE Hall of Fame

Slammy Awards

Awards and honors

Pro Wrestling Illustrated

Wrestling Observer Newsletter

Wrestling Observer Newsletter Hall of Fame

Wrestling Observer Newsletter awards

Title changes

AAA

NJPW

ROH

TNA

WWE 
 – Raw
 – SmackDown
 – ECW

Raw and SmackDown each had a world championship, a secondary championship, and a women's championship, while the male tag team championship was shared across all the brands. ECW only had a world championship.

Debuts

 Uncertain debut date
 Reby Sky
 February 20 – Zelina Vega/Rosita
 March 14 – Kazuki Hirata
 March 21 – Sawako Shimono
 March 26 – Jessie Godderz
 April 29 – Sayaka Obihiro
 May 3 – Hiragi Kurumi
 May 15 – Fuma
 August 8 – Mercedes Mone
 August 19 – Roman Reigns
 September – Taya Valkyrie
 September 2 – Alex Lee
 September 7 – Kaitlyn
 November 21 – Mika Iida
 December – Shaul Guerrero
 December 11 – Sammy Guevara
 December 12 – Ruby Soho (wrestler)
 December 25 – Mochi Miyagi

Retirements

 The Iron Sheik (1972–April 24, 2010)
 Chavo Guerrero Sr. (1970–2010)
 Ron Simmons (1986–2010)
 DJ Gabriel (2004–2010)
 Kamala (1978-2010)
 Kristal Marshall (December 2, 2005 – February 2010)
 Shawn Michaels (October 10, 1984 – March 28, 2010) (had a one-off match at Crown Jewel in 2018)
 Ray Gordy / Jesse Dalton / Slam Master J (2000 – April 23, 2010)
 Scott Hall (1984-June 2010, return to wrestle one match in 2016) 
 Ricky Steamboat (1976-June 18, 2010, returned to wrestle one match in 2022)
 Abdullah the Butcher (1958-October 9, 2010) 
 Lacey Von Erich (September 15, 2007 – November 11, 2010)
 Mae Young (August 20, 1939 – November 15, 2010)
 Caylen Croft (2001 – November 19, 2010)
 Ashley Vance (June 22, 2010-December 28, 2010)

Deaths 

 January 8 – Tony Halme, 47
 February 1 – Jack Brisco, 68
 March 4 - Angelo Poffo, 84
 March 8 - Jerry Valiant, 68
 March 11 - Sandy Scott, 75 
 March 14 - Corsica Joe, 90
 March 20 – Mikel Scicluna, 80
 March 29 - Tom Burton, 48
 April 2 – Chris Kanyon, 40
 April 14 - Gene Kiniski, 81
 April 21 – Mr. Hito, 67
 May 3: 
Kinji Shibuya, 88 
El Supremo (wrestler), 67
 May 24 - Andre Baker (wrestler), 45
 May 24 - Rusher Kimura, 68
 June 12 – Grizzly Smith, 77 
 June 12 - Trent Acid, 29 
 June 24 - Toni Adams, 45 
 July 2 - Steve Stanlee, 90 
 August 13 – Lance Cade, 29
 August 19 - Ted Allen (wrestler), 54
 August 20 - Skandor Akbar, 75
 August 27 - Anton Geesink, 76
 August 27 - Tony Borne, 84 
 August 28 - Kotetsu Yamamoto, 68
 August 30 – J. C. Bailey, 27
 September 10 – Mike Shaw, 53
 September 11 - La Fiera, 49
 September 22 – Giant González, 44 
October 6 - Gran Naniwa, 33
October 23 - Michael Porter, 59
October 30 - Édouard Carpentier, 84
November 8 - Joe Higuchi, 81
November 25 - Kantaro Hoshino, 67 
December 3 - Skip Young, 59
December 4 - King Curtis Iaukea, 73
December 15 - Hans Mortier, 85
December 18 - Donn Lewin, 84

See also
List of NJPW pay-per-view events
List of ROH pay-per-view events
List of TNA pay-per-view events
List of WWE pay-per-view events

References

 
professional wrestling